Howell Hansel (1860 – 1917), was an American film director. He directed 26 films between 1913 and 1917.

Biography 
Hansel was born in Indiana, and began his career as a stage actor on the East Coast. Eventually he gave up his acting career to join Thanhauser as a film director; he'd also direct films for Famous Players-Lasky.

His output slowed toward the end of his life as he struggled with a prolonged illness. He died in Manhattan in 1917, leaving behind a wife and a daughter.

Selected filmography 

 The Long Trail (1917)
 The Deemster (1917)
 The Goad of Jealousy (1916) (short)
 Weighed in the Balance (1916) (short)
 The Lost Paradise (1916) (short)
 A Trial of Souls (1916) (short)
 Beyond Recall (1916) (short)
 Truth Crushed to Earth (1916) (short)
 Sold Out (1916) (short)
 The Tight Rein (1916) (short)
 Tillie's Tomato Surprise (1916)
 Horrible Hyde (1915) (short)
 Colonel Carter of Cartersville (1915)
 The Road o' Strife (1915)
 A Man of Iron (1915) (short)
 A Hatful of Trouble (1914) (short)
 Zudora (1914)
 The Million Dollar Mystery (1914)
 A Dog of Flanders (1914)
 A Woman's Loyalty (1914)
 Ben Bolt (1913)

References

External links

1860 births
1917 deaths
Silent film directors
Film directors from Indiana